Roman Sergeyevich Zobnin (born 11 February 1994) is a Russian professional footballer who plays as a central midfielder for Spartak Moscow. He also plays as a right midfielder.

Club career
He made his debut in the Russian Second Division for Akademiya Tolyatti on 30 April 2011 in a game against FC Ufa, and subsequently in the Russian Premier League for Dynamo Moscow on 19 July 2013 against Anzhi Makhachkala.

On 15 June 2016, following Dynamo's relegation from the Russian Football Premier League, he moved to Spartak Moscow.

He won the Russian Premier League with his team in 2017 and the Russian Cup in 2022.

International career
On 31 March 2015, Zobnin made his debut for the Russia national football team in a friendly game against Kazakhstan.

On 11 May 2018, he was named in Russia's extended 2018 FIFA World Cup squad, also being included in the finalized World Cup squad. He played every minute of every game for the squad as Russia was eventually eliminated in a quarter-final penalty shoot-out by Croatia.

On 11 May 2021, he was included in the preliminary extended 30-man squad for UEFA Euro 2020. On 2 June 2021, he was included in the final squad. He started Russia's opening game against Belgium on 12 June 2021 and was substituted in the 63rd minute as Russia lost 0–3. He played a full match in both Russia's second game against Finland on 16 June in a 1–0 victory and on 21 June in the last group game against Denmark as Russia lost 1–4 and was eliminated.

Career statistics

Club

International
Statistics accurate as of match played 14 November 2021.

Honours
Spartak Moscow
Russian Premier League: 2016-17
Russian Cup: 2021–22
Russian Super Cup: 2017

Personal life
His older brother Aleksandr Zobnin also played football professionally.

References

External links

1994 births
Sportspeople from Irkutsk
Living people
Russian footballers
Russia youth international footballers
Russia under-21 international footballers
Russia international footballers
Association football midfielders
FC Dynamo Moscow players
FC Spartak Moscow players
Russian Premier League players
Russian Second League players
2018 FIFA World Cup players
UEFA Euro 2020 players